Barbara Ann Martin (born 1955), is a female former athlete who competed for England.

Athletics career
She represented England and won a silver medal in the 4 x 100 metres relay with Andrea Lynch, Judy Vernon and Sonia Lannaman, at the 1974 British Commonwealth Games in Christchurch, New Zealand.

References

1955 births
English female sprinters
Commonwealth Games medallists in athletics
Commonwealth Games silver medallists for England
Athletes (track and field) at the 1974 British Commonwealth Games
Living people
Medallists at the 1974 British Commonwealth Games